Donji Lapac is a settlement and a municipality in Lika, Croatia.

Geography
Donji Lapac is located a region of eastern Lika called Ličko Pounje, by the river Una that flows near the town in the valley between mountain Plješevica and Una on the altitude of 582 m. It is connected with the road that connects Bihać with Gračac.

History
The area of Donji Lapac has been inhabited since the Iron Age, which many material remains prove. During medieval times the area of Lapac was part of old-Croatian Lapac župa, related to Lapčan family, and in 1449 it became a possession of Frankopan family. Old city Lapac was located on a nearby Obljaj hill (666 m) south from Donji Lapac. When in 1528 Ottomans conquered Lika, Lapac was absorbed. In 1790 The Croatian Corps of the Habsburg Imperial Army under the command of Feldzeugmeister Joseph Nikolaus Baron de Vins liberated Lapac as well as some other parts of Croatia in the regions of Kordun and Lika, including Cetingrad, Furjan, Boričevac and Srb, and they again became parts of the Kingdom of Croatia within the Habsburg Monarchy. 

Donji Lapac was founded in 1791, in the year the Austro-Ottoman war ended and Eastern Lika was annexed by Habsburg empire as a frontier post. In the late 19th century and early 20th century, Donji Lapac was a district capital in the Lika-Krbava County of the Kingdom of Croatia-Slavonia. In 1941 Yugoslav partisans liberated the district center.

During the Croatian War of Independence, Donji Lapac was incorporated along with other towns into the unrecognized breakaway Republic of Serbian Krajina. In August 1995, it was returned to Croatian control following victories by the Croatian army.

Demographics
According to the 2011 census, the town has population of 946 and a municipality of 2,113 people. Before the war the area was almost entirely Serb-populated with only 0.67% Croats (according to the 1991 census). After the war the area of Donji Lapac municipality grew smaller because villages of Donji Srb and Gornji Srb were given to Municipality of Gračac in Zadar County. However, according to the 2011 census Serbs continue to constitute a majority of 80.6%, with 18.8% of Croat population.

Some Croats or Serbs declared their ethnicity as Yugoslav.

Population by censuses

Municipality of Donji Lapac

According to the 2011 census, municipality of Donji Lapac had 2,113 inhabitants.

Note: It became independent municipality in 2001 census, from old Comune of Donji Lapac.

1991 census

According to the 1991 census, Municipality of Donji Lapac had 4,603 inhabitants, which were ethnically declared as this:

Austro-Hungarian 1910 census

According to the 1910 census, Municipality of Donji Lapac had 11,971 inhabitants, which were linguistically and religiously declared as this:

Donji Lapac (settlement itself)

According to the 2011 census, settlement of Donji Lapac had 946 inhabitants.

Note: From 1857–1880 include data for the settlement of Gajine.

1991 census

According to the 1991 census, settlement of Donji Lapac had 1,791 inhabitants, which were ethnically declared as this:

Austro-Hungarian 1910 census

According to the 1910 census, settlement of Donji Lapac had 1,140 inhabitants in 2 hamlets, which were linguistically and religiously declared as this:

Economy
Donji Lapac is underdeveloped municipality which is statistically classified as the First Category Area of Special State Concern by the Government of Croatia. Before the war, Donji Lapac had a developed wood and textile industry. Many people worked in the transportation company Likatrans which employed more than 200 people. Today most of the inhabitants are unemployed and jobs are mostly restricted to public services or the renewed wood industry. Additionally many people work in basic agriculture, growing mostly potatoes and plums from which they make the alcohol Slivovitz.

Settlements in municipality of Donji Lapac

Birovača
Boričevac
Brezovac Dobroselski
Bušević
Dnopolje
Dobroselo
Doljani
 Donji Lapac
Donji Štrbci
Gajine
Gornji Lapac
Gornji Štrbci
Kestenovac
Kruge
Melinovac
Mišljenovac
Nebljusi
Oraovac

Notable people
Milan Đukić, Croatian Serb politician
Veljko Narančić, Yugoslav athlete
Stevo Krnjajić, Yugoslav actor

Literature 

  Savezni zavod za statistiku i evidenciju FNRJ i SFRJ, popis stanovništva 1948, 1953, 1961, 1971, 1981. i 1991. godine.
 Knjiga: "Narodnosni i vjerski sastav stanovništva Hrvatske, 1880–1991: po naseljima, autor: Jakov Gelo, izdavač: Državni zavod za statistiku Republike Hrvatske, 1998., ;

References

External links 
 Official site 

Municipalities of Croatia
Populated places in Lika-Senj County
Serb communities in Croatia